P. P. Ramachandran is a Malayalam poet.

Works 
His poems are collected in two books, Kanekkane (Thrissur: Current Books) and Rantay Murichathu (Cut into Two) (Thrissur: Current Books).

Awards 
His collection Kanekkane won the Kerala Sahitya Akademi Award for Poetry in the year 2003. Katte Kadale won the P. Kunhiraman Nair Poetry Award in 2013. He received the Cherusseri Award in 2014. He has also received awards established in memory of V. D. Kumaran, Cherukad, Kunjupillai, Changampuzha and V. K. Unnikrishnan.

Background 
He is a high school teacher in A.V.High School, Ponnani.
He lives in Vattamkulam, a small town in Malappuram district.

References

External links

Poetry from the Romantic Period to the Present Day
"Simple and silent", The Hindu, 1 August 2004

Poets from Kerala
People from Malappuram
Living people
1962 births
Malayalam-language writers
Malayalam poets
20th-century Indian poets
Indian schoolteachers